Telmatochromis bifrenatus is a species of cichlid endemic to Lake Tanganyika where it can be found at depths of from , occasionally down to .  This species can reach a length of  TL.  It can also be found in the aquarium trade where it is considered to be an excellent fish for beginners.

References

External links 
 Photograph

bifrenatus
Fish described in 1936
Taxonomy articles created by Polbot